Kent 1 (known as Shepherd Neame Kent 1 for sponsorship reasons) is an English level 9 Rugby Union League and is made up of teams predominantly from south-east London and Kent. The teams play home and away matches from September through to April. The league champions move up to London 3 South East while the runners up play against the runners up of Sussex 1 for the remaining place. Relegated teams drop down to Kent 2.

Each year some of the clubs in this division also take part in the RFU Junior Vase - a level 9-12 national competition.

Participating clubs 2021-22

The teams competing in 2021-22 achieved their places in the league based on performances in 2019-20, the 'previous season' column in the table below refers to that season not 2020-21. 

Despite finishing 7th in season 2019-20, HSBC did not return to the league for the current season.

Season 2020–21

On 30th October 2020 the RFU announced  that due to the coronavirus pandemic a decision had been taken to cancel Adult Competitive Leagues (National League 1 and below) for the 2020/21 season meaning Kent 1 was not contested.

Participating clubs 2019-20

Participating clubs 2018-19

Participating clubs 2017-18

Participating clubs 2016-17
Beccehamaian
Brockleians 
Hastings & Bexhill 
HSBC
King's College Hospital
Lordswood
New Ash Green 
Old Gravesendians
Sittingbourne (promoted from Kent 2)
Southwark Lancers
Snowdon C.W. (promoted from Kent 2)
Vigo

Participating clubs 2015-16
Beccehamaian
Brockleians (promoted from Kent 2)
Hastings & Bexhill (relegated from London 3 South East)
HSBC
King's College Hospital
Lordswood
New Ash Green (promoted from Kent 2)
Old Gravesendians
Old Williamsonians
Sheppey
Southwark Lancers
Vigo

Participating clubs 2014-2015
Beccehamian (relegated from London 3 South East)
Bexley (promoted from Kent 2)
Cranbrook
HSBC
King's College Hospital
Lordswood
Old Gravesendians
Old Williamsonians
Sheppey (relegated from London 3 South East)
Sittingbourne
Southwark Lancers
Vigo

Participating clubs 2010-2011
Ashford
Beccehamian
Cranbrook
Dartfordians
Erith
Gillingham Anchorians.
Guys' Kings' & St Thomas' Hospital
Hastings and Bexhill
HSBC
New Ash Green
Old Gravesendians
Shooters Hill
Sittingbourne
Vigo
Whitstable

Original teams

When league rugby began in 1987 this division contained the following teams:

Bromley
Charlton Park
Erith
Medway
NatWest Bank
Old Elthamians
Old Shootershillians
Park House
Sevenoaks
Thanet Wanderers
Tonbridge

Kent 1 honours

Kent 1 (1987–1993)

The original Kent 1 was a tier 8 league with promotion up to London 3 South East and relegation down to Kent 2.

Kent 1 (1993–1996)

The creation of National 5 South meant that Kent 1 dropped from a tier 8 league to a tier 9 league for the years that National 5 South was active.  Promotion and relegation continued to London 3 South East and Kent 2 respectively.

Kent 1 (1996–2000)

The cancellation of National 5 South at the end of the 1995–96 season meant that Kent 1 reverted to being a tier 8 league.  Promotion and relegation continued to London 3 South East and Kent 2 respectively.

Kent 1 (2000–2009)

The introduction of London 4 South East ahead of the 2000–01 season meant Kent 1 dropped to become a tier 9 league with promotion to this new division.  Relegation continued to Kent 2.

Kent 1 (2009–present)

Kent 1 remained a tier 9 league despite national restructuring by the RFU.  Promotion was to London 3 South East (formerly London 4 South East) and relegation to Kent 2.

Promotion play-offs
Since the 2000–01 season there has been a play-off between the runners-up of Kent 1 and Sussex 1 for the third and final promotion place to London 3 South East. The team with the superior league record has home advantage in the tie.  At the end of the 2019–20 season the Kent 1 teams have been the most successful with fourteen wins to the Sussex 1 teams five; and the home team has won promotion on eleven occasions compared to the away teams eight.

Number of league titles

Park House (4)
Dartfordians (3)
Ashford (2)
Beccehamian (2)
Cranbrook (2)
Gillingham Anchorians (2)
Aylesford Bulls (1)
Bromley (1)
Canterbury (1)
Charlton Park (1)
Dover (1)
Erith (1)
Folkestone (1)
Guys' Kings' & St Thomas' Hospital (1)
Hastings & Bexhill (1)
Lordswood (1)
Medway (1)
Old Dunstonians (1)
Sevenoaks (1)
Sheppey (1)
Southwark Lancers (1)
Thanet Wanderers (1)
Tunbridge Wells (1)
Whitstable (1)

Notes

See also
London & SE Division RFU
Kent RFU
English rugby union system
Rugby union in England

References

External links
Kent Rugby Football Union

9
Rugby union in Kent